West Fallowfield Christian School is a Christian school in Atglen, Chester County, Pennsylvania in the United States.

It was established in 1941 to partner with Christian families in educating and nurturing their children, giving them a strong academic and spiritual foundation from kindergarten through eighth grade.

The school has around 150 students, so the teachers can be closer to the students.

In Fall 2016, WFCS will offer "The Academy at West Fallowfield Christian School," a 9th grade co-op.

References

Private elementary schools in Pennsylvania
Schools in Chester County, Pennsylvania